The Kerala State Film Award for Best Character Actor is an award, begun in 2015, presented annually at the Kerala State Film Awards of India to an actor for his performance in a Malayalam film. It replaced the Kerala State Film Award for Second Best Actor, which was discontinued in 2014. The winner receives a certificate, statuette and a cash prize of ₹50,000.

Winners

See also
 Kerala State Film Award for Best Character Actress

References

External links

Kerala State Film Awards